, provisional designation , is a trans-Neptunian object and weak dwarf-planet candidate from the classical Kuiper belt in the outermost region of the Solar System, approximately  in diameter. It was first observed on 6 February 2002, by American astronomer Marc Buie at the Kitt Peak National Observatory in Arizona, United States.

Orbit and classification 

 orbits the Sun at a distance of 39.4–53.1 AU once every 314 years and 6 months (114,859 days; semi-major axis of 46.2 AU). Its orbit has an eccentricity of 0.15 and an inclination of 7° with respect to the ecliptic. The body's observation arc begins at Kitt Peak with its official first observation on 6 February 2002.

Physical characteristics 

Brown also characterizes the object as a "probable dwarf planet", an intermediate category in his classification scheme (also see list of candidates).

As of 2018, no rotational lightcurve of this object has been obtained from photometric observations. The object's rotation period, pole and shape remain unknown.

Numbering and naming 

This minor planet was numbered by the Minor Planet Center on 18 May 2019. As of 2019, it has not been named.

See also 
 List of Solar System objects most distant from the Sun

References

External links 
 MPEC 2004-E32 : 2002 CZ154, 2002 CY248, 2002 CD251, 2002 XH91, 2003 FK127, 2003 FH129, Minor Planet Electronic Circular, 11 March 2004
 
 

524435
524435
524435
20020206